The Aero Synergie Jodel D20 is a French ultralight aircraft that was designed by Jean Délémontez and produced by Aero Synergie of Villefranche-de-Rouergue. The aircraft was supplied as a kit for amateur construction or as a completed aircraft.

Aero Synergie no longer offers the D20.

Design and development
The aircraft complies with the Fédération Aéronautique Internationale microlight rules. It features a cantilever low wing, two seats in a side-by-side configuration enclosed cockpit, a choice of tricycle landing gear or conventional landing gear and a single engine in tractor configuration.

The aircraft has a wooden airframe covered in doped aircraft fabric. Like most Jodel designs its  span wing employs dihedral in the outer half only. Standard engines used are the  Rotax 912ULS four-stroke and the  Jabiru 2200 powerplant. Other engines of similar power output can also be used.

Reviewers Robby Bayerl et al. describe the aircraft as possessing "great performance and impeccable behaviour in flight".

Specifications (D20)

References

External links

1970s French ultralight aircraft
Homebuilt aircraft
Single-engined tractor aircraft
Jodel D20
Low-wing aircraft
D020